Novo-Maltsevo is a rural locality (a village) in Ulyakhinskoye Rural Settlement, Gus-Khrustalny District, Vladimir Oblast, Russia. The population was 40 as of 2010.

Geography 
Novo-Maltsevo is located 53 km south of Gus-Khrustalny (the district's administrative centre) by road. Novouvarovka is the nearest rural locality.

References 

Rural localities in Gus-Khrustalny District